Cangxi County is a county of northeastern Sichuan Province, China, located along the upper reaches of the Jialing River. It is under the administration of Guangyuan City. The population in 2020 was 512,617.

Cangxi produces red kiwifruit, a protected geographic origin product. It also produces rice, pomelo, and several pear varieties.

Administrative divisions 
Cangxi administers 31 towns and townships:

*county seat

Climate

References

External links

 
County-level divisions of Sichuan